Gunwharf Quays is a shopping centre located in the Portsea area of the city of Portsmouth in England. It was constructed in the early 21st century on the site of what had once been HM Gunwharf, Portsmouth. This was one of several such facilities which were established around Britain and the Empire by the Board of Ordnance, where cannons, ammunition and other armaments were stored, repaired and serviced ready for use on land or at sea. Later known as HMS Vernon, the military site closed in 1995, and opened to the public as Gunwharf Quays on 28 February 2001 after six years of reconstruction (which included the restoration of some of the surviving 18th and 19th-century Gun Wharf buildings). The landmark Spinnaker Tower, which stands close to the site on pilings in Portsmouth Harbour, was opened on 18 October 2005.

History

An Ordnance Yard (the Old Gun Wharf) was established on land reclaimed from the sea to the north of the old Mill Pond (which survives today as the canal) in 1706. The site was extended by reclaiming further land from the sea to the south of the old Mill Pond to create the New Gun Wharf in circa 1800. The Grand Storehouse (built as part the New Gun Wharf and now known as the Vulcan Building) was completed in 1814.

A wide range of ordnance-related equipment had to be accommodated within the Yard. Gun carriages in particular took up a lot of space, and were prone to decay if left outside. Cannons and cannonballs, on the other hand, could be stored in the open air without too much damage being done, as described here in 1817:
Every ship in ordinary has on the wharf her guns, placed in regular rows, each ship's guns by themselves, with the name of the ship they belong to, painted in capital letters on the first gun of each parcel. The balls are formed in pyramids from 42 pounders to the lowest bores, every size in a pyramid by themselves; the bomb shells are also placed in the same regular order.

In 1824 a set of storehouses along the southern edge of the site were converted to form barracks for the Royal Marine Artillery (the first time that this section of the Corps had been provided with its own separate barracks). In 1858 the Royal Marine Artillery moved out (first to Fort Cumberland, then to the new purpose-built Eastney Barracks); Gunwharf Barracks were then given over to the Royal Artillery for a time, after which they were occupied by the Army Ordnance Corps until 1891.

The Grand Storehouse was mirrored by a similarly sizeable "Sea Service Store" on the Old Gun Wharf (later remodelled to serve as the Warrior naval accommodation block). In addition to these two, a plan dated 1859 indicates more than a dozen other large storehouses all around the site.

As ships and armaments developed, the requirement to offload the armament diminished, and the Gunwharf fell into disuse. It re-established as the Royal Navy shore establishment HMS Vernon in 1923. The site became HMS Nelson in 1986 and ceased operations in 1995.

The site was then sold to Berkeley Group Holdings in 1996 and, after being redeveloped to a design by HGP Architects, re-opened as a retail outlet on 28 February 2001.

Retained historic buildings and structures

HMS Vernon suffered extensive damage during the Blitz, but a number of historic structures survived, some of which have been restored as part of the Gunwharf Quays development. 
 The Old Customs House pub and restaurant, built as an administration block in the late 18th century, is the oldest building on the site and the only significant survival on the Old Gun Wharf side.
 An early 19th-century gateway stands behind the Vulcan building, indicating the line of the original boundary of the New Gun Wharf; Initially hemmed in by the fortifications of Old Portsmouth, the site expanded further when the town fortifications were levelled in the 1870s; much of the later perimeter wall, which dates from this expansion, remains in place around the edge of the site, along with the Main Gate of c.1870.
 The Grand Storehouse (later called the Vulcan Building) was the principal structure on the New Gun Wharf, built 1811–14. Its north wing and clock tower were both destroyed in the Blitz and only reinstated as part of the Gunwharf Quays reconstruction.
 The old Royal Marines Infirmary building was originally built as an Ordnance Storehouse at around the same time as the Vulcan block; together with other nearby storehouses it was converted to form Gunwharf Barracks, of which it is the only surviving part.
 Behind the Vulcan building, and dwarfed by it, is a former shell store (Building No. 25) dating from 1856.

See also

Portsmouth
Berkeley Group plc
Land Securities

References

External links

 Portsmouth City Guide
 Gunwharf Quays Outlet Stores

Shopping centres in Hampshire
Outlet malls in England
Portsmouth